Esme Timbery (born 14 February 1931 and also known by her married name, Russell) is an Australian Bidjigal shellworker. Timbery's shellwork has contemporary elements, blended with the traditional medium. She has work in the collections of several art museums throughout Australia.

Biography 
Timbery was born in 1931 in Port Kembla and is of Bidjigal Aboriginal heritage. Timbery began to create shellwork at a young age. She comes from a long line of shellworkers, including her great-grandmother, Emma Timbery. Timbery and her sister, Rose, began to sell their shellwork in the 1940s.

Timbery currently works in La Perouse. ABC produced a documentary about her in 2007, titled She Sells Sea Shells.

Work 
Timbery's work was exhibited at the 1988 opening of the Powerhouse Museum. In 1997, her work was exhibited at the Manly Regional Museum and Gallery in the show, "Djalarinji - Something that Belongs to Us." Her work was included in the 2004 show, "Terra Alterisu: Land of Another" held at the College of Fine Arts in Paddington. She also exhibited in the 2008 Campbelltown Arts Centre show "Ngadhu Ngulili, Ngeaninyagu - A Personal History of Aboriginal Art in the Premier State." For the Message Sticks Festival in 2001, Timbery was asked to create shellworked versions of the Sydney Opera House. The Opera House pieces reflect a more contemporary use of shellworking. In 2005, she earned the NSW Indigenous Art Prize for her work. She also decorated shoes for the design label, Romance Was Born for their Spring/Summer 2009/2010 collection.

Timbery's piece, Shellworked Slippers (2008) is made up of 200 scuffs embellished with shellwork. The piece is also a memorial to the Stolen Generations. The piece was exhibited at the Sydney Biennale and is in the collection of the Museum of Contemporary Art Australia. Shellworked Slippers also represents the strength of Aboriginal women. Three of her shellworked Sydney Harbour Bridges are part of the collection of the National Museum of Australia. Timbery also has art at the National Gallery of Australia and the Art Gallery of New South Wales.

Honours 
A building at the University of New South Wales has been named in honour of Timbery, the Creative Practice Lab (ETCPL). The building is decorated with a mural titled In her hands and it is the first building at the University named after an Aboriginal woman.

References

External links 
The Aboriginal shellworkers of La Perouse, Sydney: Esme Timbery and Marylin Russell (2015 video)

1931 births
Artists from New South Wales
Indigenous Australian artists
20th-century Australian women artists
20th-century Australian artists
21st-century Australian artists
21st-century Australian women artists
Living people
Australian artisans
Shell artists